The  is Japanese aerial lift line in Minamiuonuma, Niigata, operated by Prince Hotels. The line opened in 1983 as a gondola lift line, and refurbished as an aerial tramway in 2001. The line mainly transports skiers, but also hikers and autumn color spectators in other seasons. The line only operates in "winter" (from December to March) and "summer" (from May to October).

Basic data
System: Aerial tramway, 2 track cables and 1 haulage rope
Cable length: 
Vertical interval: 
Operational speed: 10.0 m/s
The fastest in Japan.
Passenger capacity per a cabin: 81
Cabins: 2
Stations: 2
Duration of one-way trip: 7 minutes

See also
List of aerial lifts in Japan

External links
 Official website

Aerial tramways in Japan
Prince Hotels
1983 establishments in Japan